Davidson Windmill is a historic windmill in Lakeside, Wisconsin, United States. The windmill was built in 1900 and added to the National Register of Historic Places in 1979. The grist mill was built by Jacob Davidson in 1904 and operated until 1926.

See also 
 Little Chute Windmill: Another historic windmill in Wisconsin

References

Buildings and structures in Douglas County, Wisconsin
Finnish-American culture in Wisconsin
Grinding mills in Wisconsin
Grinding mills on the National Register of Historic Places in Wisconsin
Industrial buildings completed in 1900
Smock mills in the United States
Windmills
Windmills in Wisconsin
National Register of Historic Places in Douglas County, Wisconsin
1900 establishments in Wisconsin
Windmills on the National Register of Historic Places